Down the Shore is a 2011 American independent thriller film directed by Harold Guskin and starring James Gandolfini and Famke Janssen.

Plot
The owner of a Jersey shore amusement park is forced to confront his dark past when an enigmatic Frenchman shows up on his doorstep claiming to be his late sister's widowed husband.

Cast
Famke Janssen as Mary
James Gandolfini as Bailey
John Magaro as Martin
Maria Dizzia as Susan
Edoardo Costa as Jacques
Gabrielle Lazure as Brigitte Lebeau
Ruza Madarevic as Mrs. Denunzio
Joe Pope as Wiley
Bill Slover as Tico

Filming
Down the Shore was shot in Keansburg, New Jersey and Jersey Shore.

Reception and release
Down the Shore has a 45% on Rotten Tomatoes based on 11 reviews as well as 58% approval, based on 7 reviews on Metacritic. Gabe Toro of IndieWire said that "Down the Shore at least deserves credit for its strong performances (though the less said about too-old John Magaro’s turn as Mary’s autistic son, the better)". The film also received a 1.5 out of 5 from Chuck Bowen of Slant Magazine who said that "the film suggests what might happen if TBS and Bruce Springsteen were to collaborate on a sitcom set in hell".

Simon Bookfield of We Got This Covered gave Down the Shore a "Fair" score, saying in his closing comments that "in terms of pace, Down the Shore walks a very narrow line between deliberate and utterly languid, but there are just enough strong performances and intriguing (if messy) dynamics to make it work". Variety was quoted saying that "The virtue of this standard family tale is James Gandolfini's most substantial feature role to date", while Michael Rechstshaffen of The Hollywood Reporter said that "a rock solid James Gandolfini performance keeps this slice-of-Jersey-life drama grounded".

The film came out on Blu-ray Disc on April 9, 2013. Besides the film itself, the disc featured Sharon Stone's flick Border Run.

References

External links

2011 thriller films
2011 films
American independent films
American thriller films
Films set in amusement parks
Films set in New Jersey
Films set in Paris
Films shot in New Jersey
Films shot in Paris
2011 independent films
2010s English-language films
2010s American films